The 2007 Omloop Het Volk – Women's race took place on 18 March 2007. It was the 2nd women's edition of the Omloop Het Volk.

Results

References

Omloop Het Nieuwsblad – Women's race
Omloop Het Nieuwsblad
Omloop Het Volk
Omloop Het Volk - Women's race